External may refer to:

 External (mathematics), a concept in abstract algebra
 Externality, in economics, the cost or benefit that affects a party who did not choose to incur that cost or benefit
 Externals, a fictional group of X-Men antagonists

See also

Internal (disambiguation)